Oliver Dalrymple (1830–1908) was an American bonanza farmer and land speculator who grew very rich during his time in the 19th century. He was notable for his production of 600,000 bushels of wheat in one year, with one of the largest farms in the United States. Its size has been estimated at about 115 square miles, and was opened in 1875. Having died in 1908, his farm was then passed down to his two sons, William Dalrymple and John Stewart Dalrymple.

See also
 Grandin brothers

References

External links
 History of the Dalrymple Fram at Fargo-History

19th-century American farmers
1830 births
1908 deaths
20th-century American farmers
Farmers from Minnesota